Mohamed Hachaichi (26 February 1951 – 6 June 2013) was an Algerian wrestler. He competed in the men's freestyle 52 kg at the 1980 Summer Olympics.

References

External links
 

1951 births
2013 deaths
Algerian male sport wrestlers
Olympic wrestlers of Algeria
Wrestlers at the 1980 Summer Olympics
Place of birth missing
20th-century Algerian people